Antaeotricha insimulata is a moth of the family Depressariidae. It is found in Colombia.

The wingspan is about 26 mm. The forewings are light greyish-ochreous, the costal edge whitish except towards the extremities. The second discal stigma is dark fuscous and there is a faintly indicated curved waved fuscous shade from before the middle of the costa to the dorsum at two-thirds. There is a more distinct similar line from the costa at three-fifths to the dorsum before the tornus, with a narrow acute indentation above the middle and a marginal series of blackish dots around the apical part of the costa and termen. The hindwings are pale greyish with the costa anteriorly slightly expanded and with an ochreous-whitish subcostal hairpencil from the base to the middle.

References

Moths described in 1926
insimulata
Moths of South America
Taxa named by Edward Meyrick